This is a partial listing of alumni and professors and teachers of the New England Conservatory, Boston.

Alumni
More former students can be found at :Category:New England Conservatory alumni

Eunice Alberts, contralto
Charlie Albright, pianist and composer
Kenneth Amis, composer, tuba player, educator, and conductor
Ted Atkatz, percussionist
Ross Bauer, composer
Rick Beato, musician, YouTuber, music educator
Herbert Blomstedt, conductor
Neal E. Boyd, pop and "opera" singer
Cindy Bradley, jazz trumpet player and composer
George Brooks, saxophonist
Nellie Moyer Budd, music teacher
Percy Jewett Burrell, dramatist and playwright
Don Byron, jazz clarinetist and composer
Sarah Caldwell, conductor
Sean Callery, composer
Colin Carr, cellist
Regina Carter, violinist
Young-Chang Cho, cellist
John Clark, jazz horn player and composer
Becca Conviser, operatic soprano
Marilyn Crispell, jazz pianist
Tan Crone, pianist
Phyllis Curtin, soprano
Rob Dehlinger, trumpeter, singer/songwriter
Roberto Diaz, violist
Mary A. G. Dight, physician
Dave Douglas, jazz trumpet
Marty Ehrlich, jazz saxophonist
Ehud Ettun, bassist and composer
Halim El-Dabh, composer
Mohammed Fairouz, composer
Melissa Ferlaak, soprano
Everett "Vic" Firth, percussionist
David Frank, pianist, producer, composer
Satoko Fujii, avant garde jazz pianist
Michael Gandolfi, composer
Bianca Garcia, flute, politician
Marilinda Garcia, harp, politician
Anthony Glise, classical guitarist, composer, author
Judith Gordon, pianist
Denyce Graves, mezzo-soprano
Zona Maie Griswold, soprano
Fred Hersch, jazz pianist
Bud Herseth, trumpet
Randall Hodgkinson, pianist
Dave Holland, jazz bassist
Winifred Horan, fiddler
Alan Hovhaness, composer
Marie Jansen, musical theatre actress
Sarah Jarosz, singer/songwriter, mandolin, banjo, guitar
Rebecca Richardson Joslin (1846–1934), author, lecturer, benefactor, clubwoman
Rose Fitzgerald Kennedy, Kennedy Family matriarch
Sunny Kim, jazz vocals
Coretta Scott King, voice, civil rights leader
Mátti Kovler, composer
Louis Krasner, violinist
Vuk Kulenovic, classical composer
Eugene Edward Lacritz, conductor, clarinetist, executive
Brian Landrus, saxophonist, flutist, clarinetist, composer
Thomas Oboe Lee, composer
Larry Marshall, actor and singer
Heather Masse, singer
Andy McGhee, jazz saxophonist, educator
John Medeski, jazz pianist
Nellie Brown Mitchell, 19th-century African-American soprano
Dorothea Rhodes Lummis Moore physician, writer, newspaper editor, activist
John Moriarty, conductor, stage director, pianist
Aoife O'Donovan, singer/songwriter
Christopher O'Riley, pianist
Gladys Pitcher, composer
Conrad Pope, composer, arranger, and film orchestrator 
Cora Scott Pond Pope, teacher, pageant writer, real estate developer
Florence Price, composer
Rachael Price, jazz vocalist
Matana Roberts, jazz saxophonist, composer and visual artist
Pete Robbins, jazz saxophonist
Marcus Rojas, tubist
Lisa Saffer, soprano and teacher
Jamie Saft, pianist/multi-instrumentalist
Nick Sanders, jazz pianist and composer
David Sanford, composer and jazz bandleader
Byron Schenkman, harpsichordist, pianist
Sergey Schepkin, pianist
Andrew Scott, jazz guitarist and professor
Deke Sharon, a cappella vocalist, arranger, producer
Luciana Souza, jazz vocals
David Spelman, guitarist, producer, curator
Isabele Taliaferro Spiller, musician, music educator, and school co-founder
Lara St. John, violinist
Eleanor Steber, soprano
Robert Strassburg, composer, conductor, musicologist, professor
Cecil Taylor, jazz pianist
Nestor Torres, Latin jazz flutist
Nicholas Urie, jazz composer, arranger
Monir Vakili, singer
Burr Van Nostrand, composer
Tom Varner, jazz French hornist, composer
VenetianPrincess, soprano
Cuong Vu, trumpeter
Linda Watson (soprano), dramatic soprano and academic voice teacher
Chou Wen-chung, composer
Mildred Weston, author, composer
Elise Fellows White, composer, violinist
Raymond Wilding-White, composer
Henry F. Williams, composer
Bruce Wolosoff, composer
Bernie Worrell, pianist, rock musician
Yitzhak Yedid, composer & pianist
Rachel Z, jazz performer
Nancy Zhou, violinist
Zhu Xiao-Mei, pianist

More former students can be found at :Category:New England Conservatory alumni

Notable past and present teachers 
More former and present teachers can be found at :Category:New England Conservatory faculty

 Katja Andy
 Trevor Barnard
 Jeanne Baxtresser
 Jerry Bergonzi
 Ran Blake
 Bob Brookmeyer
  Bruce Brubaker
 Richard Burgin
 Ferruccio Busoni
 Jaki Byard
 Simon Carrington
 Robert Cogan
 Vinson Cole
 Francis Judd Cooke
 Gabriel Chodos
 Patricia Craig
 Lyle Davidson
 Dorothy DeLay
 Stephen Drury
 Lorna Cooke deVaron
 Doriot Anthony Dwyer
 Dominique Eade
 Frank Epstein
 Robin Eubanks
 Pozzi Escot
 John Ferrillo
 Alan Fletcher (composer)
 Vic Firth
 Eliot Fisk
 D'Anna Fortunato
 Michael Gandolfi
 George Garzone
 Boris Goldovsky
 Bernard Greenhouse
 Billy Hart
 Fred Hersch
 Randall Hodgkinson
 Dave Holland
 Karen Holvik
 Lee Hyla
 Paul Kantor
 Kim Kashkashian
 Eyran Katsenelenbogen
 Paul Katz
 Harrison Keller
 Rudolf Kolisch
 Louis Krasner
 Eugene Lehner
 Theodore Lettvin
 Joe Maneri
 Donald Martino
 Cecil McBee
 John McNeil
 Ossian Everett Mills
 Gladys Childs Miller
 Stratis Minakakis
  Jason Moran
 Hankus Netsky
 Donald Palma
 Maurice W. Parker, Sr.
 Ann Hobson Pilot
 Danilo Perez
 Cora Scott Pond Pope
 Quincy Porter
  Eustace Bond Rice
 Paula Robison
 Carol Rodland
 Eric Rosenblith
 George Russell
 Lisa Saffer
 Ken Schaphorst
 Gunther Schuller
 Russell Sherman
 Joseph Silverstein
 Nicolas Slonimsky
 Fenwick Smith
 Richard Stoltzman
 Antoinette Szumowska
 Bertha Tapper
 Miroslav Vitouš
 Beveridge Webster
 Blanche Winogron
 Felix Wolfes
 Hugh Wolff
 Douglas Yeo
 Edward Zambara
 Benjamin Zander

More former and present teachers can be found at :Category:New England Conservatory faculty

 
 
New England Conservatory